M. S. Sundara Rajan் (born 8 March 1950), is an Indian banking consultant, economist and was previously the head of Indian Bank. Rajan is a M.A. (Econ), CAIIB and A.C.S. He is a visiting faculty to many institutions. His core expertise is in investment banking, project finance, corporate restructuring and capital market. Rajan is known to be a soft-spoken and polite person. Rajan has visited Singapore, London, Tokyo, Hong Kong, New York & Dubai on business engagements. Rajan is an ardent Caranatic Music Fan and can speak in over five languages.

Rajan won the Golden Peacock Award on behalf of Indian Bank in October 2009. He has been part of several key strategic initiatives at Indian Bank including launching of initial IPO, introduction of Biometric ATM and introduction of touch screen kiosk across various Indian bank branches in India.

According to The Economic Times press release, Rajan was ranked 45th in the Economic Times India Inc's most powerful CEOs list (2009). He was ranked No.2 among the CEOs of Nationalized Banks and No.6 among the CEOs of Commercial banks. During his leadership, Indian Bank received Golden peacock National Training Award for the year 2009 presented at a special awards function on 9 October 2009 at London during the 10th International conference on Corporate Governance.It was during his tenure that Indian Bank appeared first in featured in the list of Forbes 2000–2009 (1659th position). Rajan was also pivotal in setting up Dharavi's first bank, a place that has over Rs. 1000 billion of market potential.

On 31 May 2010, Rajan was appointed as a member to look into customer service for banks by RBI.

In March 2013 he was appointed as the Chairman of Institute of Directors – Tamil Nadu state Chapter

Education and early life
Born in Chennai, Tamil Nadu, Sundara Rajan did his school at the prestigious P. S. Senior Secondary School, Chennai. He is an alumnus of one of Chennai's finest colleges, the Ramakrishna Mission Vivekananda College in Mylapore, Chennai. Rajan joined the Indian Bank in early 1970s. He soon quit Indian Bank and joined Union Bank of India.

Career

Early career

Rajan built his career in Union Bank of India where he started off as a probationary officer and rose to the rank of general manager. Sundara Rajan is seen as a major contributor to the banking industry with his core inclination towards credit. After joining Union Bank his first posting was at Coimbatore, where
he worked as an officer for a span of two years. Soon, he was promoted
and transferred to Nagamam in Tamil Nadu, where he headed the branch. Within a span of one year, he was transferred to Bangalore staff training college, Union Bank's training facility. He was a member of the Faculty of Union Bank Staff Training establishment at Bangalore for nearly seven years after exposure at field level from 1972 to 1981. Soon thereafter, he was posted to the Zonal Office of the bank. Union Bank's Zonal Office was going through a challenging phase being amongst the pioneers to introduce credit cards in India. With his previous credit experience, Rajan was put in charge of overseeing the initial phase of issuing over 30,000+ credit cards. The outcome was a success and the bank awarded him a new role at Union Bank's Zonal office in Chennai.

Later career
In mid 1990s, the Indian industries experienced a significant growth and new government reforms like liberalisation were introduced to help these industries grow further. Union Bank's Top Management were working on a proposal to create a branch which could exclusively cater to the industry's needs. The outcome of this was the Industrial Finance Branch. Rajan joined the branch as the Chief Manager in 1994. With his team of 100 employees, the Industrial finance branch (IFB) made an impact in the industrial markets of Mumbai by generating larger than expected revenues. Shortly thereafter, Rajan was promoted again. He was transferred to New Delhi as the head of the Delhi's Industrial Finance Branch. He was later brought back to Mumbai and soon, promoted to general manager at Mumbai Zonal office. He was a nominee of Union Bank of India on the Board of Dewan Housing Finance Corporation Ltd for nearly two years.

Indian Bank 
Subsequently, he joined Indian Bank as executive director in April 2006 and was Director on the Boards of M/s. Indbank Merchant Banking Services Ltd., M/s IndBank Housing Ltd., and M/s Indfund Management Ltd. – all subsidiaries on Indian Bank from April 2006 to 3 June 2007. Credit appraisal is said to be one of his main fortes. Rajan assumed charge of the Indian Bank on 3 June 2007 as the chairman and managing director. Rajan was a member of the Committee on Agro Business of Indian Banks' Association. He was Member of the Committee on Diploma in Banking & Finance and Junior Associate in Indian Institute of Banking & Finance, Mumbai (IIBF). Rajan was also a Director in United India Insurance Company Ltd and actively contributed in the board deliberations.

Thoughts, influences and contributions

Thoughts and influence
Rajan is a self-avowed "Task and People Oriented Leadership", referring to the philosophy developed by management Gurus Robert R. Blake and Jane Mouton. Rajan trademark was his liking for customers and employees.

Rajan is an avid academician. His interest towards academia in India has seen him being the visiting faculty for many events including Liba & MOP Viashnav

Contributions
During his tenure at Indian Bank, Rajan played a pivotal role in assisting the bank to enter the stock market (Bombay Stock Exchange BSE) and filed its draft in the red herring prospectus (DRHP) with the Securities and Exchange Board of India (SEBI) on 1 December 2006 with a proposal to enter the capital market with its initial public offering of equity shares. Sundara Rajan was also instrumental in setting up Dharavi first bank within the "heart of Dharavi". Lakhs of migrants who run thousands of tiny businesses there send Rs 3,000–40 billion every year to hometowns in Tamil Nadu and other parts of India. Indian Bank thanks to its strong network in Tamil Nadu will allow its customers to benefit deeply. On 2 April 2009, according to The Economic Times press release, Rajan is amongst the top 50 most powerful CEO's and amongst the top 20 professional CEO's in India.

Personal life
Rajan and his family were featured on Indian National Television, Doordarshan under a show called "Vetrikku Pennal". The show focused on the life of Indian Bank CMD. Rajan lives in Chennai and is a Hindu. He is married to Lalitha, who is a native of Chennai. He has two kids, Arvind and Lakshmi. Rajan is an avid music listener. He is also a sports enthusiast.
Rajan's wife, Lalitha has done her Post graduate in science from Mysore University . She was previously employed with Deloitte and is currently a home-maker. In the show, Lalitha had quoted that Rajan is an extremely positive human being and likes to take on challenges. The show was aired on 14 November 2009 (8:30 PM). Due to public demand and rise of Television Rating Point, it was re-aired on 16 November 2009 (3:00 PM) and on 22 November 2009 (6:00 PM). Rajan was recently spotted on  website.

References

External links
 "Profile"

Living people
1950 births
20th-century Indian economists
University of Madras alumni